In July may refer to:

 Im Juli (English:In July), a 2000 German film 
 "Frozen Peas", alternatively titled "In July", a blooper audio recording of Orson Welles